Procrica intrepida is a species of moth of the family Tortricidae. It is found in Kenya, Madagascar, the Comoros and South Africa, where it has been recorded from open grassland areas in Natal.

References

Moths described in 1912
Archipini